No good deed goes unpunished (often shortened to No Good Deed) is a sardonic commentary on the frequency with which acts of kindness backfire on those who offer them.

No Good Deed may also refer to:
 No Good Deed (2002 film), an American film by Bob Rafelson
 No Good Deed (2014 film), an American film by Sam Miller
 No Good Deed (2017 film), an American short film featuring Deadpool
 No Good Deed (novel), by John Niven (2017)
 "No Good Deed" (song), a 2003 song from the Broadway musical Wicked
 "No Good Deed" (CSI: NY), a 2009 episode of CSI: New York
 "No Good Deed" (Parenthood), a 2010 episode of Parenthood
 "No Good Deed" (Person of Interest), an episode of the American television drama series Person of Interest

See also
 Only the good die young (disambiguation)
 Nice guys finish last